The Moment of Truth is the third installment in The Emo Diaries series of compilation albums, released February 23, 1999 by Deep Elm Records. As with all installments in the series, the label had an open submissions policy for bands to submit material for the compilation, and as a result the music does not all fit within the emo style. As with the rest of the series, The Moment of Truth features mostly unsigned bands contributing songs that were previously unreleased.

Reviewer Kurt Morris of Allmusic remarks that "this third installment of the Emo Diaries saga is strong from start to finish" and that "Penfold's track should be required listening for all people proclaiming to have a knowledge of what the term emo means." While criticizing some of the songs towards the middle of the compilation as "a bit weak", he notes that "Chase Theory, Epstein, and Last Days of April all contribute dynamic and passionate tracks to help close the album out persuasively. A very convincing and solid release, this very well might be the peak of these celebrated compilations."

Track listing

References

External links 
 The Moment of Truth at Deep Elm Records.

1999 compilation albums
Deep Elm Records compilation albums
Emo compilation albums
Indie rock compilation albums